A Cannonball Run is an unsanctioned speed record for driving across the United States, typically accepted to run from New York City's Red Ball Garage to the Portofino Hotel in Redondo Beach near Los Angeles, covering a distance of about .

History
The cannonball run began as an unofficial, unsanctioned automobile race run five times in the 1970s from New York City and Darien, Connecticut, on the East Coast of the United States to the Portofino Inn in the Los Angeles suburb of Redondo Beach, California. These races were called the Cannonball Baker Sea-To-Shining Sea Memorial Trophy Dash.

Conceived by car magazine writer and auto racer Brock Yates and fellow Car and Driver editor Steve Smith, the first run was not a competitive race as only one team was running. The run was intended both as a celebration of the United States Interstate Highway System and as a protest against strict traffic laws coming into effect at the time. Another motivation was the fun involved, which showed in the tongue-in-cheek reports in Car and Driver and other auto publications worldwide. The initial cross-country run was made by Yates; his son, Brock Yates, Jr.; Steve Smith; and friend Jim Williams beginning on May 3, 1971, in a 1971 Dodge Custom Sportsman van called the "Moon Trash II."

The race was run four more times: November 15, 1971; November 13, 1972; April 23, 1975; and April 1, 1979.

Format
A second starting point emerged for the 1979 running at the Goodwives Shopping Center in Darien, Connecticut. The route from this point is said to be approximately 48 miles farther than the Red Ball Garage starting point. Since the record is unsanctioned, there are no official limits imposed on cars, routes, technologies, or strategies used in record runs. Record-setting runs are typically self-verified by record-setters through witnesses, toll receipts, continuous video of the run, and GPS tracking. Contemporary record-setting runs are typically driven by a team of drivers and copilots in a high-performance, but inconspicuous car. Cars are commonly modified with auxiliary fuel tanks to extend range, and are frequently modified to increase performance and durability. Cars are also commonly modified to help evade police, using equipment such as police radio, radar and laser detectors and/or jamming, and cosmetic alterations that obscure the car's identity. Several attempts have also implemented police-spotting teams traveling ahead of the record-run in cars or even general-aviation aircraft.

Legality and ethics
Record attempts are criticized for their illegality and disregard for public safety.

List of records

Outright Cannonball record
A spotter plane was deployed for the daytime sections. This and the U.S. Express are depicted in the 2019 documentary APEX: The Secret Race Across America.

In May 2007, Richard Rawlings and co-pilot Dennis Collins allegedly broke the 1979 Cannonball Run time during the 2007 Bullrun entry, driving a black Ferrari 550, modified with extra fuel tanks. Their final time was 31 hours and 59 minutes.

Bolian and Black shared driving with Bolian serving as the primary driver while Huang served as spotter watching for police and obstructions such as deer or construction using image stabilized binoculars.

In November 2019, the driving team of Arne Toman and Doug Tabbutt, with spotter Berkeley Chadwick, set a transcontinental record of 27 hours 25 minutes. The 2015 Mercedes-Benz E63 AMG was modified to provide 800 horsepower and fitted with an additional fuel cell in the trunk providing  enabling the team to stop just four times for fuel for a total of just over 22 minutes. The car was also equipped with police scanner, CB radio, a thermal camera to help the team spot police on the ground and in the air as well as a laser jammer. The team left early November ahead of Thanksgiving travel traffic and chose a route based on weather forecasts which provided dry weather through the entire trip.

During the COVID-19 Pandemic

The record was broken multiple times during the COVID-19 pandemic, taking advantage of a reduction in both road users and law enforcement presence.

In April 2020, an anonymous crew traveled from the Red Ball Garage on the east side of Manhattan to the Portofino Hotel in Redondo Beach, California—a total of —in 26 hours 38 minutes.  The team averaged .  The record was completed in a 2019 Audi A8L with additional fuel tanks in the rear storage.

In May 2020, Arne Toman, Doug Tabbutt, and spotter Dunadel Daryoush set the new cannonball record of 25 hours and 39 minutes in a modified 2016 Audi S6 disguised to look like a Ford Taurus police interceptor. Police-evasion modifications included brake light kill-switches, radar detectors, laser diffusers, CB-radio, and a roof-mounted thermal camera. Performance modifications included a trunk-mounted 67-gallon auxiliary fuel cell sourced from the car used in Toman and Tabbutt's 2019 cannonball run, modified turbochargers, an upgraded heat-exchanger, and custom ECU tuning that allowed for engine-mapping to be changed on-demand to suit either 91 or 93-octane fuel; allowing the car to generate an estimated 600 horsepower.

In early June 2020, as reported by Road & Track, Fred Ashmore allegedly completed a solo run in 25 hours and 55 minutes. The claim has now been cast into doubt by Road & Track after further investigation revealed that the evidence to support the claim had been doctored.

Double transcontinental record
Also in May 2020, the team of Chris Clemens and Mark Spence in a highly modified Mercedes SL500 followed the Toman/Tabbutt team out of New York, drove from the Red Ball Garage in New York to the Portofino Inn in LA and then turned around and went back to the Red Ball Garage in 74 hours and 5 mins.

In April 2022, the team of Nik Krueger, Mark Spence and Wesley Vigh drove from the Red Ball Garage in New York to the Portofino Hotel and Marina in LA, then back to the Red Ball Garage in 65 hours and 28 minutes, shattering the prior record by nearly eight and a half hours.  The team used a modified 2008 Saab 9-5. Mark Spence remains the only person in Cannonball Run history since Brock Yates to challenge their own record and beat it.

Diesel record
On April 4, 2020 the 3 man team consisting of Sean G. Petr, Jason Adkins, and Mark Spence piloted a 2014 Volkswagen Passat TDI SE from Goodwives Shopping Center in Darien, Connecticut to the Portofino Hotel and Marina in Redondo Beach, California in 28 hours and 30 minutes beating both the previous diesel record and Darien-Redondo time by more than 3 hours. The team averaged both 25.5mpg and 100.07mph over the 2,852-mile journey.

Motorcycle record
Motorcycle between New York and Los Angeles 1917 to Present:

 Alan T Bedell drove a Henderson 4 cylinder motorcycle from LA to NYC in 7 days, 16 hours, and 16 minutes on June 13, 1917.
 Erwin "Cannonball" Baker drove his Ace motorcycle from LA to NYC in 6 days, 22 hours, 52 minutes in 1922.
 Wells Bennet rode an Excelsior/Henderson in 1922 to cross NYC to LA in 6 days, 16 hours, 13 minutes.
 Earl Robinson in 1935 did the run in 3 days, 6 hours, 53 minutes.
 Rody Rodenberg set his record of 71 hours 20 minutes during June 17–20, 1936, on a 1936 Indian Scout. This was disputed by Dot Robinson.
 John Penton (of Penton racing fame) set a time of 52 hours 11 minutes for the solo LA-to-NYC motorcycle run in 1959. The trek was made on a BMW R69S.
 Tibor Sarossy, at the time a college student, set a record in 1968 of 45 hours 41 minutes. Tibor used a homemade fuel cell made of jerry cans, which allowed for a reported four fuel stops. He also claims he never slept, although he did pass out from a diet of Hershey Bars and coffee at a produce inspection station in California. He averaged 58.7 mph on a BMW R69S.
 Fred Boyajian set a new time of 42 hours 6 minutes on October 11, 1969. Fred used a beer keg to provide extra fuel. Evidence was Western Union telegrams at New York City and Los Angeles.
 Carl Reese left from West Valley Cycle Sales BMW Dealership in Winnetka, California, at 3:15 a.m. PST on August 28, 2015. Reese arrived at BMW Motorrad dealership in Manhattan, New York City, at 9:04 p.m. EST the next day, travelling 2,829 miles in 38 hours 49 minutes (average speed 72.88 MPH) on a K1600GT BMW motorcycle. The trip was documented by notaries at both start and finish.
 Adam Frasca posted a time of 37 hours and 7 minutes. Frasca departed Manhattan, NYC at 12:03 AM EDT Tuesday, April 9, 2019 and arrived Redondo Beach, LA at 10:10 AM PDT.
 Calvin Cote completed the run in a time of 35 hours 6 minutes, departing the Portofino Hotel and Marina at 3:00 AM PDT April 20, 2019 and arriving at the Red Ball Garage at 5:06 PM EDT April 21, 2019. The 2,772 mile run was completed on a 2012 BMW K1600 GTL equipped with a 15-gallon auxiliary fuel tank, radar detector, and radar/lidar absorbing paint.
Alex Jones set a new benchmark of 32 hours and 52 minutes atop his 2014 Yamaha FJR1300. The bike was equipped with a 7-gallon auxiliary fuel tank, radar detector, laser jammers, and additional lighting. Jones left the Red Ball Garage on Oct 17, 2021 at 6:24 AM EDT and arrived at Portofino Hotel at 12:16 PM PDT the following day, covering more than 2,800 miles with stops only to refuel.

Electric vehicle record
In 1968, the Great Transcontinental Electric Car Race was held between student groups at Caltech and MIT. The Caltech team, led by EV pioneer Wally Rippel, converted a 1958 VW Microbus powered by lead cobalt batteries from Electric Fuel Propulsion Corporation of Detroit. The MIT team converted a 1968 Chevrolet Corvair powered by NiCad batteries. The MIT team raced from Cambridge, Massachusetts, to Pasadena, California, while the Caltech team raced the opposite direction. A network of 54 charging locations was set up along the 3,311-mile route, spaced 21 to 95 miles apart. The race began on August 26, 1968, and ended on September 4. Although the MIT team reached Pasadena first, they were towed part of the way. After assessing penalty points, Caltech was declared the winner with a corrected time of 210 hours 3 minutes.

With the introduction of long-range EVs, such as the Tesla Roadster (2008) and, in particular, the Tesla Model S, coast-to-coast travel became more feasible. In January 2014, Tesla Motors completed the first coast-to-coast corridor in their supercharging network for the Model S. A team from Tesla Motors completed a 3,427-mile route from Los Angeles to New York City run in 76 hours, 5 minutes. (Time included 60 hours, 8 minutes driving, and 15 hours, 57 minutes charging.) In July 2014, a team from Edmunds completed a slightly shorter 3,331.9-mile route in 67 hours, 21 minutes. (Time included 52 hours, 41 minutes driving, and 14 hours, 40 minutes charging.)

Carl J. Reese and co-drivers Rodney Hawk and Deena Mastracci took advantage of a newly opened corridor on Interstate 70 to drive the 3,011-mile route from the City Hall in Los Angeles to the City Hall in New York City in 58 hours and 55 minutes during April 16–19, 2015, a new record for EVs in a 2015 Tesla Model S P85D. The drivers stopped 24 times for electric charging, with a total charge time of 12 hours 48 minutes. As proof, Reese presented 16 documents notarized on both ends, identifying drivers and three eyewitnesses: Matt Nordenstrom, Johnnie Oberg Jr., and Anthony Alvarado. Complete GPS logs recorded by GPSInsight (a fleet tracking company) were sent to Jalopnik, Guinness Book of World Records. GPSInsight provided GPS tracking equipment to the team to verify the event. Reese's team of three drivers broke Tesla Motors' (team of 15 drivers) previous record of 76 hours 5 minutes and Edmunds.com's (team of two drivers) previous record of 67 hours 21 minutes.

On October 18–21, 2015, Deena Mastracci and Reese were joined by Alex Roy. They beat Mastracci and Reese's prior record of 58 hours, 48 minutes for an LA–NYC run in an electric vehicle with a total time of 57 hours, 48 minutes.

On August 24–27, 2016, the LA–NYC record was broken again by a team comprising Alex Roy, Righthook CEO Warren Ahner, and StreetWars founder Franz Aliquo, who completed the run in 55 hours flat in a 2016 Tesla Model S 90D. GPS logs were recorded by US Fleet Tracking, and Comma.AI's Chffr data logger, and data was shared with The Drive.

In December 2017, with an early-production Tesla Model 3, which are delivered to California-based customers only, Alex Roy and co-driver Dan Zorrilla broke the eastbound Electric Cannonball Run record again, driving 2,860 miles from the Portofino Inn to the Red Ball Garage in 50 hours and 16 minutes. Their drive took place December 28–31 of 2017. GPS data was captured using the GPS Tracks application, and video evidence was shared on YouTube.

In August 2019, Kyle Conner and Matthew Davis set a record of 45 hours and 16 minutes driving westbound from New York City to Los Angeles in a Long-Range Rear-Wheel-Drive Tesla Model 3 which had been modified, including lowering the car for better aerodynamics.

At the end of 2020, Kyle Conner, Drew Peterson and Tijmen Schreur lowered the EV record to 44:26 despite winter conditions in an Out of Spec Motoring Porsche Taycan with the large battery, aerodynamic wheels, and massaging seats, using Electrify America CCS chargers with up to 350 kW.

In October 2021, the EV record was broken twice in the same rented 2021 Tesla Model S Long Range. The first drive, from Los Angeles to New York City, by Ryan Levenson and Will Wood, lowered the EV record to 42:52. The second drive occurred on October 22, 2021, leaving from the Red Ball Garage in Manhattan at 11:00am and arriving at the Portifino Inn in Redondo Beach, CA 42 hours, 17 minutes later. The second drive was piloted by a driver team of Ryan Levenson and Josh Allan.

Semi-autonomous vehicle record
In April 2015, the first coast-to-coast autonomous record was set by employees of Delphi. Delphi engineers covered 3,400 miles, San Francisco to New York City, over a span of nine days.

In October 2015, Carl J. Reese, Deena Mastracci, and Alex Roy set a new coast-to-coast record using Tesla's new Autopilot function. The trio made the 2,995-mile journey in 57 hours, 48 minutes after departing from Redondo Beach, California on October 18 at 9:15 p.m. PST, and arriving at Red Ball Garage in New York on October 21 at 10:03 a.m. EST. The trip was completed with fewer than 14 hours of charging and 96 percent of the driving done by Tesla's Autopilot system. This record was a first outside of manufacture testing, proving that automated systems can deliver people coast to coast safely in record time.

As of August 27, 2016, the semi-autonomous (Level 2) driving record stands at 55 hours, set during the electric cross-country record run by Franz Aliquo, Warren Ahner, and Alex Roy in a Tesla Model S 90D, whose "Autopilot" function was engaged 97.7% of the way.

Cannonball record progression

See also
 Street racing about the practice of illegally using public roadways for automobile races
 The Bandit Run, a similar challenge between Texarkana, TX and Atlanta, GA
 The Cannonball Run, a 1981 film starring Burt Reynolds, racing against rival teams

References

Auto races in the United States